Gil Vázquez de Soverosa (died  1240) was a member of the nobility of the Kingdom of Portugal, of the Soverosa lineage which had its origins in Galicia.  He appears frequently as a member of the curia regis confirming royal charters of Kings Sancho I, Afonso II, and Afonso III of Portugal.

Biography 
His parents were Vasco Fernandes de Soverosa and Teresa Gonçalves de Sousa, daughter of Gonçalo Mendes de Sousa, a patron of the Monastery of Santa Maria de Pombeiro, and Dórdia Viegas. Three of his sons benefited from the Repartimiento after the conquest of Seville in 1248.

Tenente  in several places in Portugal, including Barros in 1207; Sousa between 1234 and 1235; Barroso from 1207 to 1240; and, Panóias and Montealegre, he owned numerous properties in the Guimarães region and was Lord of Sobroso Castle in Vilasobroso. Gil Vasques de Soverosa died around 1240 and was buried at the Monastery of Santa Maria de Pombeiro.

Marriage and issue 
He married three times. The first marriage was before April 1175 with Maria Aires de Fornelos, who died around 1212. daughter of Aires Nunes de Fornelos and Mor Pais (Mayor Peláez), and granddaughter of Soeiro Mendes da Maia, a member of the powerful Maia lineage. Before her marriage, she had two children out of wedlock with King Sancho I of Portugal; Martim and Urraca Sanches. From the marriage of Gil Vasques and Maria Aires, the following children were born:

 Martim Gil de Soverosa the Goodman (died c. 1259), married to Inés Fernández de Castro, the daughter of Fernán Gutiérrez de Castro and Milia Íñiguez de Mendoza. A daughter of this marriage, Teresa Martins de Soverosa was the wife of Rodrigo Eanes de Meneses, the parents of João Afonso Telo, the 1st Count of Barcelos and 4th Lord of Alburquerque.
 Teresa Gil de Soverosa, mistress of King Alfonso IX of León with whom she had four children.

His second marriage at around 1212 was with Sancha González de Orbaneja, They had three children:
 Vasco Gil de Soverosa, a troubadour who took part in the conquest of Andalusia where he was given land in the repartimiento of Seville. He married Fruilhe Fernandes de Riba de Vizela.
 Manrique Gil de Soverosa. 
 Guiomar Gil de Soverosa (died before 1247).

His third marriage was with María González Girón, the widow of Guillén Pérez de Guzmán and daughter of Gonzalo Rodríguez Girón and Sancha Rodríguez. María had several children from her first marriage including Mayor Guillén de Guzmán, mistress of King Alfonso X of Castile, the parents of Queen Beatrice of Castile, wife of Afonso III of Portugal. Gil Vázquez de Soverosa and María were the parents of:

 Juan Gil de Soverosa (died after 1247), the husband of Constance de Riba de Vizela,without issue.
 Fernando Gil de Soverosa (died before 1247), he could have been the son of Gil's first marriage or this one.
 Gonzalo Gil de Soverosa (died after 1247), without issue.
 Sancha Gil de Soverosa (died before September 1262), married, before November 1257 as the second wife of Alfonso López de Haro, son of Count Lope Díaz II de Haro, Lord of Biscay.
 Dórdia Gil de Soverosa, a nun at the Monastery of Arouca.

Notes

References

Bibliography 
 
 
 
 
 

12th-century births
1240s deaths
Portuguese nobility
13th-century Portuguese people